Katende Jerome Raymond (born 29 September 1987) is a Ugandan professional footballer who formerly plays for Malaysian Premier League side Universiti Sains Malaysia in Malaysia. Although he primarily plays as a left winger, he can also operate as a striker, speed being his main attribute.

He started his playing career with Ugandan side SC Villa in 2003, having graduated from high school, and he made 45 appearances for the side, before switching to other Ugandan side Police in 2006. After making 27 appearances with Police scoring 18 goals, Ugandan side Uganda Revenue Authority SC enticed him and joined them in 2007. During his 2 years with U.R.A he made 25 appearances for the club, before moving to Oman's Premier League side Al Nasrin 2009. After a successful year in Oman, he joined Malaysian Premier League side Universiti Sains Malaysia Staff F.C. where he currently plays.

External links
 

1987 births
Ugandan footballers
Uganda international footballers
SC Villa players
Living people
Association football forwards
Sportspeople from Kampala